Luis Bermejo Rojo (12 August 1931 – 12 December 2015) was a Spanish illustrator and comics artist known for his work published in Spain, Italy, Great Britain, and the United States. He has illustrated a number of novels, and worked for a while with DC Comics.

Biography 

Bermejo initially learned the trade as the assistant of Manuel Gago, before he began his comic book artist career in Britain in the late 1950s when through the agency A.L.I., he worked in the titles Girls' Crystal and Tarzan Weekly.  He worked on Thriller Picture, John Steel, War, Battle Picture Libraries, and Pike Mason in the early 1960s. In 1962 he started drawing the war-themed comic strip Mann of Battle for The Eagle, and would draw the strip Heros the Spartan for that title in 1963. Later in the 1960s he would draw the super hero Johnny Future.  For much of the 1960s, Bermejo worked out of a studio in Valencia, Spain for the agency Bardon Arts with other artists including José Ortiz, Miguel Quesada, and Emilio Frego. These artists including Bermejo started working with Italian agent Pierro D'Ami in 1968, where they would do many paintings for books and magazines.  During this period Bermejo would do a number of comic strips for the magazines Tell Me Why, Once Upon a Time, Look and Learn and Tiny Tots.

In 1974 Bermejo, along with fellow Valencia Studio artists José Ortiz and Leopoldo Sanchez joined the agency Selecciones Ilustradas and soon started working for Warren Publishing in U.S.A. Bermejo quickly became one of the most prolific artists for Warren, and would draw a total of 78 stories from 1974 through 1983, more than any other artist except for José Ortiz and Esteban Maroto.  Highlights of Bermejo's period with Warren included a full issue of Creepy (issue 71) dedicated to him, as well as the role of the primary artist for The Rook, which was Warren's most well known recurring character after Vampirella. Bermejo would also draw the serial The Fox in Vampirella in 1981 - 1982.  He would win the award for Best All Around Artist at Warren in 1981.

Bermejo would write and draw an adaption of El Señor de los Anillos (The Lord of the Rings) in Spain in 1980. After Warren's collapse, he would draw for Skorpio and Lanciostory in Italy,  as well as Relatos Nuevo Mundo, Metropol and Zona 84 in Spain. He also created comics adaptations from the works of Isaac Asimov and Raymond Chandler.

References

Sources

External links 
 Biography on Lambiek Comiclopedia
 Biography on Dan Dare
 Luis Bermejo's Lord of the Rings comic adaptation The Tolkien Library

1931 births
2015 deaths
Spanish comics artists
Spanish illustrators
20th-century Spanish male artists
Artists from Madrid